Bo Patrik Liljestrand (born 25 January 1966) is a Swedish former handball player who competed in the 1992 Summer Olympics. He is currently the coach of Energa MKS Kalisz.

He was a member of the Swedish handball team which won the silver medal at the 1992 Summer Olympics.

External links
Profile

1966 births
Living people
People from Uddevalla Municipality
Swedish male handball players
Swedish handball coaches
Olympic handball players of Sweden
Handball players at the 1992 Summer Olympics
Olympic silver medalists for Sweden
Olympic medalists in handball
Medalists at the 1992 Summer Olympics
Sportspeople from Västra Götaland County